Meslay-le-Vidame is a commune in the Eure-et-Loir department in northern France.  The lords of Meslay held the title of Vidame of Chartres for part of the Middle Ages.

Population

See also
Communes of the Eure-et-Loir department

References

Communes of Eure-et-Loir